Bellavista Terrace: Best of the Go-Betweens is a compilation album by Australian band The Go-Betweens.

Track listing
(All songs by Grant McLennan and Robert Forster)

 "Was There Anything I Could Do?" (1988) – 3:09
Originally released on 16 Lovers Lane
 "Head Full of Steam" (1986) – 3:41
Originally released on Liberty Belle and the Black Diamond Express
 "That Way" (1983) – 4:09
Originally released on Before Hollywood
 "Part Company" (1984) – 4:53
Originally released on Spring Hill Fair
 "Cattle and Cane" (1983) – 4:19
Originally released on Before Hollywood
 "Draining the Pool for You" (1984) – 4:19
Originally released on Spring Hill Fair
 "The Wrong Road" (1986) – 4:55
Originally released on Liberty Belle and the Black Diamond Express
 "Bye Bye Pride" (1987) – 4:07
Originally released on Tallulah
 "Man O'Sand to Girl O'Sea" (1983) – 3:27
Originally released as a single
 "The House That Jack Kerouac Built" (1987) – 4:42
Originally released on Tallulah
 "Bachelor Kisses" (1984) – 3:33
Originally released on Spring Hill Fair
 "Streets of Your Town" (1988) – 3:39
Originally released on 16 Lovers Lane
 "Spring Rain" (1986) – 3:07
Originally released on Liberty Belle and the Black Diamond Express
 "Dive for Your Memory" (1988) – 4:10
Originally released on 16 Lovers Lane

Charts

References

1999 compilation albums
The Go-Betweens compilation albums